Leesville is a city in, and the parish seat of, Vernon Parish, Louisiana, United States. The population was 6,612 at the 2010 United States Census. It is part of the Fort Polk South Micropolitan Statistical Area and is additionally served by the Leesville Airport. The city is home to the Fort Polk U.S. Army installation. The populations of Fort Polk and Leesville, if combined, would result in a city with a population of more than 20,000.

Geography

Climate
This climatic region is typified by hot, humid summers and mild winters. According to the Köppen Climate Classification system, Leesville has a humid subtropical climate, abbreviated "Cfa" on climate maps.

Demographics

2020 census

As of the 2020 United States census, there were 5,649 people, 2,415 households, and 1,266 families residing in the city.

2000 census
As of the census of 2000, there were 6,753 people, 2,841 households, and 1,650 families residing in the city. The racial makeup of the city was 55.49% White, 35.33% African American, 1.47% Native American, 2.09% Asian, 0.56% Pacific Islander, 2.25% from other races, and 2.81% from two or more races. Hispanic or Latino of any race were 4.92% of the population.

There were 2,841 households, out of which 29.0% had children under the age of 18 living with them, 36.2% were married couples living together, 18.3% had a female householder with no husband present, and 41.9% were non-families. Nearly 36.7% of all households were made up of individuals, and 11.4% had someone living alone who was 65 years of age or older. The average household size was 2.29 and the average family size was 3.02.

In the city, the population was spread out, with 26.1% under the age of 18, 11.0% from 18 to 24, 28.6% from 25 to 44, 20.5% from 45 to 64, and 13.9% who were 65 years of age or older. The median age was 34 years.  For every 100 females, there were 96.0 males. For every 100 females age 18 and over, there were 91.4 males.

The median income for a household in the city was $23,864, and the median income for a family was $30,435. Males had a median income of $27,267 versus $21,661 for females. The per capita income for the city was $14,360. About 24.5% of families and 28.7% of the population were below the poverty line, including 42.0% of those under age 18 and 15.1% of those age 65 or over.

Education
The Vernon Parish School District operates public schools:
 Hicks High School K-12
Pickering Elementary School K-6
Pickering High School 7-12
West Leesville Elementary School: 1-4
East Leesville Elementary School: PK-K
Vernon Middle School: 5th and 6th grade
Leesville Jr. High: 7th and 8th grade
Leesville High School: 9th through 12th grade

The Vernon Parish Public Library operates the Main Library and the Dunbar Branch Library.

Notable people

 Bert A. Adams, state representative from Vernon Parish from 1956 to 1968
 James Armes, Louisiana state representative for Beauregard and Vernon parishes since 2008; former member of the Vernon Parish School Board and landscape contractor in Leesville
Ward Connerly,  political activist, businessman, and former University of California Regent (1993–2005). He is the founder and the chairman of the American Civil Rights Institute, and is considered to be the man behind California's Proposition 209, which prohibits affirmative action in that state.
 Michael Ford (American football), LSU runningback
Eddie Fuller - NFL player, running back with the Buffalo Bills, also played for Louisiana State University and was part of the play which became known as the "Earthquake game".
Bo Harris -  NFL player, played with the Cincinnati Bengals
Carolyn Huntoon - NASA scientist, first woman director of the Johnson Space Center
Buddy Leach - Politician, former member of the United States House of Representatives from Louisiana's 4th congressional district, Louisiana House of Representatives, and Louisiana Democratic state chairman; unsuccessful candidate for state treasurer in 1987, governor in 2003, and for the Louisiana State Senate in 2007; brother of Carolyn Huntoon
Demond Mallet - Professional basketball player, guard. Played in the German League and currently with Spanish Joventut Badalona.
Kevin Mawae - NFL All-Pro Center for the Tennessee Titans New York Jets, Pro Football Hall of Fame
D'Anthony Smith - NFL player, born in Berlin, Germany, but spent his teen years in Leesville while his family was stationed at Fort Polk. Attended Pickering High School in Leesville and Louisiana Tech. Currently plays for the Jacksonville Jaguars
John R. Smith, state senator, former state representative, and former president of the Vernon Parish Police Jury

References

External links

 City of Leesville

Cities in Louisiana
Cities in Vernon Parish, Louisiana
Cities
Cities in the Central Louisiana